Salahuddin Ahmed is a Bangladeshi economist, civil servant, and a former governor of the Bangladesh Bank, the country's central bank. He is a professor of BRAC University.

Early life and education 
Ahmed was born in Old Dhaka and his family were originally from Nabinagar Upazila, Brahmanbaria District. He graduated from Dhaka Collegiate School in 1963. Ahmed did his masters in 1969 in economics from the University of Dhaka. He completed his second masters and PhD from McMaster University in 1974 and 1978 respectively.

Career
Ahmed joined the University of Dhaka as a lecturer and later joined the Civil Service of Pakistan. He was appointed the Assistant Commissioner of Dhaka District. He served as the executive magistrate of Pirojpur District. He worked at the National Foundation for Research on Human Resource Development which merged with Bangladesh Institute of Development Studies later. He worked at the Centre on Integrated Rural Development for Asia and the Pacific.

Ahmed is a former Director General of Bangladesh Academy for Rural Development from 1993 to 1995. Ahmed was the Director General of the NGO Affairs Bureau at the Prime Minister's Office.

Ahmed was the Managing Director of Palli Karma Sahayak Foundation from 1996 to 2005. In 1998, he joined BRAC as Deputy Executive Director.

Ahmed was the ninth governor of Bangladesh Bank. After the retirement of Fakhruddin Ahmed he took the responsibility of Bangladesh Bank on 1 May 2005 and he took rest from his duty on 31 April 2009. As a Fulbright Scholar, he taught at Marlboro College in the State of Vermont in the United States for a year. In 2006, he received the Distinguished Alumni Award back from McMaster University. 

From 2009, Ahmed taught at North South University and University of Dhaka. He was a professor of business at North South University from 2010 to 2014 and then joined BRAC University. He is a trustee of Gono University.

In 2020, Ahmed was appointed an independent director of ASA International. He is one of the founders of Centre for Advanced Research and Social Action, non-profit. He is a member of the general committee of the NGO Forum. He is an independent director of GrameenPhone. He is an advisor to Southeast University Journal of Arts and Social Sciences of Southeast University.

Personal life 
Ahmed's daughter is also a faculty at North South University and his son is a faculty at the South Dakota State University.

References

External links
 List of Governor of Bangladesh Bank

Living people
Bangladeshi economists
Governors of Bangladesh Bank
Year of birth missing (living people)
University of Dhaka alumni
McMaster University alumni
Academic staff of the University of Dhaka
Academic staff of the North South University
Academic staff of BRAC University
People from Dhaka
Bangladeshi civil servants